The women's basketball tournament at the 2018 Commonwealth Games was held on the Gold Coast, Australia from April 5 to 15. The basketball competition was held at three venues: Cairns Convention Centre in Cairns, Townsville Entertainment and Convention Centre in Townsville for the preliminaries and the Gold Coast Convention and Exhibition Centre on the Gold Coast for the finals. This was the second time that the basketball competition was held at the Commonwealth Games. A total of eight women's competed (96 athletes, at 12 per team) in each respective tournament.

Qualification
A total of eight women's teams qualified to compete at the games. At least four out of the six Commonwealth regions were considered to be represented in each tournament, if possible. For the home nations, each country may compete, however the ranking of Great Britain was given to the home nation with the most players on the team. The teams were officially confirmed on July 28, 2017.

Rosters

At the start of tournament, all eight participating countries had up to 12 players on their rosters.

Referees
The following referees were selected for the tournament.

James Boyer
Sarah Carey
Jon Chapman
Christine Vuong
Arnauld Kom Njilo
Simon Unsworth
Kate Webb
Snehal Bendke
Ceciline Michael Vincent
Sandy Ng
Artur Decastro
Matthew Bathurst
Ryan Jones
Viola Gyorgyi
Chris Dodds
Shuet Mei Ho
Joyce Muchenu

Competition format
The host nation, along with the top three teams in the FIBA Rankings played in group A. The other four teams played in group B. The top two teams in group A after the preliminary round advanced to the semifinals, while third and fourth place played the top two teams in group B in the qualifying round. The bottom two teams in group B were eliminated.

Results
All times are Australian Eastern Standard Time (UTC+10)

Preliminary round

Pool A

Pool B

Medal round

Qualifying finals

Semifinals

Bronze medal match

Gold medal match

Final standings

References 

2018
2018 in women's basketball